Kurt Coleman (born July 1, 1988) is a former American football safety. He was drafted by the Philadelphia Eagles in the seventh round of the 2010 NFL Draft. He played college football at Ohio State.

Early years
Coleman graduated from Northmont High School in Clayton, Ohio in 2006. He was ranked 14th at the position of cornerback according to scout.com for 2006.

College career
Coleman played college football at Ohio State. At a spring practice during his first year, Coleman tackled wide receiver Tyson Gentry. Gentry became paralyzed. Coleman almost quit the football team before Gentry forgave him during a hospital visit. In 2009, Coleman made 68 tackles, five interceptions and three forced fumbles. He earned first-team All-American honors by Sporting News and first-team All-Big Ten honors.

Professional career

Philadelphia Eagles
The Philadelphia Eagles selected Coleman in the seventh round (244th overall) of the 2010 NFL Draft. He was the 18th safety selected and the second safety drafted by the Eagles in 2010.

2010
On June 3, 2010, the Philadelphia Eagles signed Coleman to a four-year, $1.83 million contract that also includes a signing bonus of $43,400.

Throughout training camp, Coleman competed against Nate Allen and Quintin Demps to be the starting free safety after Marlin Jackson ruptured his Achilles tendon. On September 2, 2010, Coleman recorded five combined tackles and returned two fumble recoveries for touchdowns in the Eagles' 21–17 loss to the New York Jets in their fourth preseason game. Head coach Andy Reid named Coleman the backup safety to begin the regular season, behind starters Nate Allen and Quintin Mikell.

He made his professional regular season debut in the Philadelphia Eagles' season-opener against the Green Bay Packers and recorded two solo tackles in their 27–20 loss. He made his first career tackle on wide receiver Jordy Nelson during a 27-yard kick return by Nelson in the first quarter. On November 7, 2010, Coleman collected three combined tackles in the Eagles' 26–24 victory against the Indianapolis Colts. During the second quarter, Coleman received a penalty for unnecessary roughness after he was part of a helmet-to-helmet collision with wide receiver Austin Collie. The hit rendered Collie unconscious and he was immediately carted off the field and was later diagnosed with a concussion. NFL commissioner Roger Goodell chose not to fine Coleman for the hit. In Week 10, Coleman earned his first career start in place of Nate Allen who was inactive due to an injury. He made five combined tackles, deflected a pass, and made his first career interception off a pass by quarterback Donovan McNabb during a 59–28 win at the Washington Redskins. On December 20, 2010, it was reported that Coleman would assume the starting free safety role after Nate Allen sustained a season-ending knee injury against the New York Giants the previous week. In Week 16, he made his second career start and collected a season-high seven solo tackles in a 24–14 loss to the Minnesota Vikings. Coleman was inactive for Eagles' Week 17 loss to the Dallas Cowboys after head coach Andy Reid opted to rest him for the playoffs. He finished his rookie season with 36 combined tackles (31 solo), two pass deflections, and an interception in 15 games and two starts.

The Philadelphia Eagles finished first in the NFC East with a 10–6 record. On January 9, 2011, Coleman started in his first career playoff game and recorded seven combined tackles during a 21–16 loss to the eventual Super Bowl XLV Champions, the Green Bay Packers in the NFC Wildcard Game.

2011
Coleman entered training camp slated as the starting free safety after Quintin Mikell departed for the St. Louis Rams in free agency. Defensive coordinator Juan Castillo held a competition to name a new starting free safety between Coleman and rookie Jaiquawn Jarrett. Coleman was officially named the starter at free safety, alongside Nate Allen, to begin the regular season.

He started in the Philadelphia Eagles' season-opener at the St. Louis Rams and recorded four solo tackles in their 31–13 victory. In Week 3, Coleman was benched during a 29–16 loss to the New York Giants. Head coach Andy Reid played Jarrad Page in his place and he remained the starter ahead of Coleman for the next two games (Weeks 4–5). Coleman received his starting job back in Week 6 after Page was inactive for three games (Weeks 6–8) due to an injury. On October 16, 2011, Coleman collected seven combined tackles, deflected three passes, and intercepted three passes by quarterback Rex Grossman in the Eagles' 20–13 win at the Washington Redskins in Week 6. He was the first Eagles player since 1966 to have three interceptions in one game. His performance helped snap a four-game losing streak and earned him NFC Defensive Player of the Week. In Week 9, he collected a season-high 12 combined tackles (ten solo) during a 30–24 loss to the Chicago Bears. On November 27, 2011, Coleman made a season-high 11 solo tackles and assisted on a tackle in a 38–20 loss to the New England Patriots in Week 12. On December 28, 2011, the Philadelphia Eagles placed Coleman on injured reserve due to a biceps injury he sustained during a Week 16 win at the Dallas Cowboys. Coleman finished his second season with 78 combined tackles (56 solo), five pass deflections, and four interceptions in 15 games and 13 starts.

2012
Throughout training camp, Coleman competed against O. J. Atogwe and Jaiquawn Jarrett to maintain his job as the Eagles' starting free safety. Head coach Andy Reid named Coleman and Allen the starting safety duo to begin the 2012 regular season.

He started in the Philadelphia Eagles' season-opener at the Cleveland Browns and recorded five solo tackles, two pass deflections, and intercepted two passes by quarterback Brandon Weeden in the Eagles' 17–16 victory. In Week 3, he collected a season-high nine combined tackles and broke up a pass during a 27–6 loss at the Arizona Cardinals. On October 16, 2012, the Philadelphia Eagles fired defensive coordinator Juan Castillo and promoted their coach of the secondary, Todd Bowles. On October 28, 2012, Coleman collected a season-high eight solo tackles in the Eagles' 30–17 loss to the Atlanta Falcons in Week 8. In Week 13, Coleman made five combined tackles before exiting the Eagles' 38–33 loss at the Dallas Cowboys after suffering an injury to his chest. It was later discovered to be a bruised sternum and Coleman was sidelined for the next two games (Weeks 14–15). On December 31, 2012, it was announced that the Philadelphia Eagles had fired head coach Andy Reid after they finished fourth in the NFC East with a 4–12 record. He finished the  season with 93 combined tackles (70 solo), four pass deflections, an interception, and a forced fumble in 14 games and 14 starts.

2013
Coleman participated in an open competition held by defensive coordinator Billy Davis to name two new starting safeties. During training camp, he competed against Kenny Phillips, Patrick Chung, Colt Anderson, Dave Sims, Nate Allen, and rookies Jordan Poyer and Earl Wolff. Head coach Chip Kelly named Coleman the backup free safety to begin the regular season, behind Patrick Chung. In Week 8, Coleman collected a season-high four combined tackles during a 48–20 win at the Oakland Raiders. He was sidelined for the Eagles' Week 16 victory against the Chicago Bears after straining his hamstring the previous week. Coleman finished his fourth season with 15 combined tackles (14 solo) in 15 games and zero starts.

The Philadelphia Eagles finished first in the NFC East with a 10–6 record in their first season under head coach Chip Kelly. On January 4, 2014, Coleman made one tackle in the Eagles' 26–24 loss to the New Orleans Saints in the NFC Wildcard Game.

2014
Coleman became an unrestricted free agent after the 2014 season. He attended private visits with multiple teams, including the Minnesota Vikings, Indianapolis Colts, and New York Jets. On April 11, 2014, it was reported by ESPN that Coleman had received a contract offer from the Minnesota Vikings, but was still weighing his options.

Minnesota Vikings
On April 14, 2014, the Minnesota Vikings signed Coleman to a one-year, $900,000 contract. Throughout training camp, he competed for a job as a backup safety against Jamarca Sanford, Andrew Sendejo, Robert Blanton, Mistral Raymond, Chris Crocker, and Antone Exum. On August 31, 2014, the Minnesota Vikings released Coleman as part of their final roster cuts.

Kansas City Chiefs
On September 2, 2014, the Kansas City Chiefs signed Coleman to a one-year, $730,000 contract, reuniting him with Andy Reid, who served as his head coach in Philadelphia. Defensive coordinator Bob Sutton named him the backup free safety to start the regular season, behind Eric Berry.

On September 14, 2014, Coleman made his Kansas City Chiefs' debut during a 24–17 loss at the Denver Broncos in Week 2. In Week 4, he made his first start of the season and made one tackle during their 41–14 win against the New England Patriots. On November 9, 2014, Coleman collected a season-high six combined tackles in the Chiefs' 17–13 victory at the Buffalo Bills in Week 10. In Week 17, Coleman made two solo tackles, two pass deflections, and intercepted two passes by Philip Rivers in a 19–7 victory against the San Diego Chargers. He finished his only season with the Kansas City Chiefs with a total of 37 combined tackles (34 solo), six pass deflections, three interceptions, and a forced fumble in 15 games and three starts.

2015
He became an unrestricted free agent after completing his one-year contract with the Chiefs. Coleman's representatives met with personnel from the Chiefs at the NFL Combine, but both parties were unable to reach an agreement for him to return to Kansas City.

Carolina Panthers

On March 16, 2015, the Carolina Panthers signed Coleman to a two-year, $2.80 million contract with $600,000 guaranteed. He reunited with defensive coordinator Sean McDermott, who previously coached the Philadelphia Eagles' secondary.

During training camp, Coleman competed against Tre Boston for the job as the starting free safety. Head coach Ron Rivera officially named Coleman the starting free safety to begin the regular season, opposite strong safety Roman Harper.

On November 8, 2015, he made six combined tackles and recorded his first career sack on quarterback Aaron Rodgers in the Panthers' 37–29 win against the Green Bay Packers. In Week 10, Coleman collected five combined tackles, broke up a pass, and intercepted a pass attempt by Marcus Mariota during a 27–10 victory at the Tennessee Titans. On November 26, 2015, Coleman made three combined tackles, deflected a pass, and returned an interception by Tony Romo for a 36-yard touchdown in the Panthers' 33–14 win at the Dallas Cowboys in Week 12. The interception returned for a touchdown marked the first score of his career and also continued his three-game interception streak. On December 13, 2015, he made nine combined tackles, a pass deflection, and intercepted a pass attempt by quarterback Matt Ryan as the Panthers routed the Atlanta Falcons 38–0 in Week 14. The interception marked his seventh pick of the season and became his fifth consecutive game with an interception. The following week, Coleman collected a season-high 13 combined tackles (eight solo) in the Panthers' 38–35 victory at the New York Giants in Week 15. He finished his first season with the Carolina Panthers with 90 combined tackles (55 solo), nine pass deflections, a career-high seven interceptions, a sack, and a touchdown in 15 games and 15 starts. Pro Football Focus gave Coleman the seventh highest overall grade among safeties in 2015.

The Carolina Panthers finished first in the NFC South with a 15–1 record and received home-field advantage and a first round bye. The Panthers began the playoffs by defeating the Seattle Seahawks 31–24 in the NFC Divisional Round. On January 24, 2016, Coleman recorded four combined tackles, two pass deflections, and intercepted two passes by quarterback Carson Palmer during a 49–15 victory against the Arizona Cardinals in the NFC Championship Game. On February 7, 2016, Coleman started in Super Bowl 50 and recorded five combined tackles as the Carolina Panthers lost to the Denver Broncos by a score of 24–10.

2016
On July 26, 2016, the Carolina Panthers signed Coleman to a three-year, $17 million contract extension that includes $7 million guaranteed.

In Week 4, Coleman collected six solo tackles, deflected a pass, and returned an interception for an eight-yard touchdown during a 48–33 loss at the Atlanta Falcons. On November 27, 2016, Coleman recorded a season-high 11 combined tackles (eight solo) before exiting the Panthers' 35–33 loss at the Oakland Raiders in the fourth quarter due to a concussion. He was sidelined due to the concussion and missed the Panthers' 40–7 loss at the Seattle Seahawks the following week. He finished the season with a career-high 95 combined tackles (66 solo), seven pass deflections, four interceptions, and a touchdown in 15 games and 15 starts. Pro Football Focus gave Coleman an overall grade of 79.2, which ranked him 41st among the 90 NFL safeties that qualified in 2016.

2017
Defensive coordinator Steve Wilks named Coleman the starting strong safety to begin the regular season, alongside starting free safety Mike Adams. On October 1, 2017, Coleman recorded two combined tackles before exiting in the second quarter of a 33–30 victory at the New England Patriots due to a knee injury. He was declared inactive for the next three games (Weeks 5–7) after it was discovered he sprained his MCL. On December 24, 2017, Coleman collected a season-high ten combined tackles (eight solo) in the Panthers 22–19 win against the Tampa Bay Buccaneers. Coleman was sidelined for the Panthers' Week 17 loss at the Atlanta Falcons after sustaining an ankle injury. He finished the  season with 76 combined tackles (51 solo) and three pass deflections in 12 games and 12 starts. Pro Football Focus gave Coleman an overall grade of 47.0, ranking 76th among all qualified safeties in 2017.

2018
On February 26, 2018, Coleman was released by the Panthers.

New Orleans Saints
On March 3, 2018, the New Orleans Saints signed Coleman to a three-year, $16.35 million contract that also includes $6.20 million guaranteed and a signing bonus of $4.50 million. He played in 16 games with nine starts, recording 32 tackles and a forced fumble.

On February 21, 2019, Coleman was released by the Saints.

Buffalo Bills
On July 19, 2019, Coleman signed a one-year contract with the Buffalo Bills.

Personal life
Coleman co-founded the Ohio State chapter of Uplifting Athletes. Coleman's father, Ron, was diagnosed with breast cancer in December 2006. Ron was an assistant principal at Walter E. Stebbins High School in Riverside, Ohio. Ron Coleman is a physical fitness teacher and a varsity basketball coach at Stebbins High School in Riverside, Ohio for the 2019-2020 school year.

References

External links

ESPN profile

1988 births
Living people
People from Clayton, Ohio
Players of American football from Dayton, Ohio
American football safeties
Ohio State Buckeyes football players
Philadelphia Eagles players
Minnesota Vikings players
Kansas City Chiefs players
Carolina Panthers players
New Orleans Saints players
Buffalo Bills players